Vazzano is a comune (municipality) in the Province of Vibo Valentia in the Italian region Calabria, located about  southwest of Catanzaro and about  east of Vibo Valentia.

Vazzano borders the following municipalities: Filogaso, Pizzoni, Sant'Onofrio, Simbario, Stefanaconi and Vallelonga.

Demographic evolution

References

www.prolocovazzano.it pro loco vazzano

Cities and towns in Calabria